Roman Aleksandrovich Bykov (born 16 March 1992) is a Russian former professional football player.

Club career
He made his Russian Football National League debut for FC Shinnik Yaroslavl on 8 May 2012 in a game against FC Mordovia Saransk.

External links
 Career summary at sportbox.ru
 
 
 

1992 births
Living people
Russian footballers
Association football midfielders
FC Lokomotiv Moscow players
FC Shinnik Yaroslavl players
FC Vityaz Podolsk players